Corticium furcatum is a species of sponge in the order Homosclerophorida. It was first described in 2021, from a fragmented specimen collected at a depth of 5-7 m on the Booker Rocks in Jurien Bay. 

It is distinguished by its "large calthrops and exclusive candelabra with bifurcated rays in the apical actine".

References

Homoscleromorpha
Animals described in 2021
Taxa named by Guilherme Muricy